Sapore di te is a 2014 Italian film directed by Carlo Vanzina and written by Carlo and Enrico Vanzina. It depicts the lives of several groups of characters interacting at the beach of Forte dei Marmi during the mid-1980s. The film is set thirty years after the Vanzinas' 1982 film Sapore di mare, also set at Forte dei Marmi, but is not a sequel to that film.

Cast

 Vincenzo Salemme: Onorevole Piero De Marco
 Maurizio Mattioli: Alberto Proietti
 Nancy Brilli: Elena Proietti
 Katy Saunders: Sabrina Proietti
 Serena Autieri: Susy Acampora
 Martina Stella: Anna Malorni
 Giorgio Pasotti: Armando Malenotti
 Andrea Pucci: Sandro 
 Valeria Graci: Cristina 
 Fiammetta Cicogna: Nicoletta

References

External links
 

Italian comedy films
2014 films
Films directed by Carlo Vanzina
Films set in the 1980s
Films set on beaches
Films set in Tuscany
2010s Italian-language films
2010s Italian films